Two ships of the United States Navy have borne the name Beale, in honor of Edward Fitzgerald Beale.

  , was a Paulding-class destroyer, commissioned in 1912 and scrapped in 1934.
  , was a Fletcher-class destroyer, commissioned in 1942 and struck in 1968.

Sources
 

United States Navy ship names